This article displays the qualifying draw of the 2011 Regions Morgan Keegan Championships.

Players

Seeds

  Kei Nishikori (qualifying round)
  Björn Phau (qualifying round)
  Igor Kunitsyn (qualifying round)
  Dustin Brown (qualifying round)
  Michael Russell (qualified)
  Jan Hájek (qualified)
  Robert Kendrick (qualified)
  Ryan Sweeting (qualified)

Qualifiers

  Jan Hájek
  Ryan Sweeting
  Robert Kendrick
  Michael Russell

Qualifying draw

First qualifier

Second qualifier

Third qualifier

Fourth qualifier

References
 Qualifying Draw

2011 - Men's qualifying
Regions Morgan Keegan Championships - qualifying
2011 in sports in Tennessee
Qualification for tennis tournaments